Yu Rui (Chinese: 于睿; Pinyin: Yú Ruì; born 11 August 1992 in Benxi) is a Chinese footballer who plays as a defender for Kunshan, on loan from Shanghai SIPG in the China League One.

Club career
Yu Rui would play for the Xiamen Lanshi youth team until they were disbanded in 2008, before joining Chengdu Blades youth team. At Chengdu Blades he was loaned out to their satellite team Sheffield United (Hong Kong) who were allowed to play in the 2008–09 Hong Kong First Division League. He made his debut in a league game on 25 October 2008 4–1 victory against Mutual. At the end of his loan period Yu Rui was promoted to the senior team of his parent club, however it was decided that he should get game time and he was once again loaned out to another Hong Kong club in Fourway Rangers and then a third tier Chinese club in Tianjin Songjiang. At Tianjin Songjiang he quickly established himself within the team and went on to win promotion with the side in the 2010 league season by gaining a runners-up spot within the league.

In the second tier, Yu would help establish Tianjin Songjiang within the division and by the 2012 China League One season was given the captaincy. With his contract nearing its end, Yu transferred to Chinese Super League side Guizhou Renhe with a free transfer on 28 December 2012. Within the top tier, Yu struggled to gain any playing time and 27 July 2013, he was loaned to China League Two side Hebei Zhongji until 31 December 2013. His loan period would see him immediately establish himself within the team and win promotion with the club by coming runners-up within the division. Yu would return from his loan period and go on to make his debut for Guizhou Renhe on 22 April 2014 in a AFC Champions League group stage game against Western Sydney Wanderers FC that ended in a 5–0 defeat.

On 16 December 2016, Yu moved to Super League side Changchun Yatai. He would make his debut for the club on 2 April 2017 in a league game against Shandong Luneng Taishan F.C. in a 2–0 defeat. After the game he would eventually start to establish himself within the team and go on to score his first goal for the club on 15 September 2017 in a league game against Tianjin TEDA F.C. that ended in 5–1 victory. The following season would see Yu established as a regular within the team, however despite this he was part of the squad that was relegated at the end of the 2018 Chinese Super League season. While he remained with the club for another season on 23 January 2020, Yu transferred to Super League side Shanghai SIPG for 20 million Yuan. He would utilized very sparingly at Shanghai and was loaned out to second tier club Kunshan where he would go on to establish himself as a vital member within the team that won the division as well as promotion to the top tier at the end of the 2022 China League One campaign.

Career statistics 
Statistics accurate as of match played 25 December 2022.

Honours

Club 
Kunshan
 China League One: 2022

References

External links
 

Living people
1992 births
Association football defenders
Chinese footballers
People from Benxi
Footballers from Liaoning
Chengdu Tiancheng F.C. players
Tianjin Tianhai F.C. players
Hebei F.C. players
Beijing Renhe F.C. players
Changchun Yatai F.C. players
Shanghai Port F.C. players
Chinese Super League players
China League One players
China League Two players
Hong Kong First Division League players